Sackville may refer to:

People
Sackville (surname)
Sackville (given name)

Places

Australia
Sackville, New South Wales, a suburb of Sydney
Sackville Ward, Melbourne, a residential precinct

Canada
Sackville Island, Thompson Sound (British Columbia)
Sackville, New Brunswick
Sackville Parish, New Brunswick
Sackville (electoral district), Nova Scotia
Sackville River, Nova Scotia
Fort Sackville (Nova Scotia), a former British fortification built in 1749

Ireland
Sackville Street, a former name of O'Connell Street, Dublin

United Kingdom
Sackville Street, London, England
Sackville Street, Manchester, England

Music
Sackville Records, a Canadian jazz record label
Sackville (band), a band from Montreal, Quebec, Canada
A song on the 1990 album Life by Inspiral Carpets

Other uses 
HMCS Sackville (K181), a Canadian Second World War corvette, later a civilian research vessel, now a museum ship
Viscount Sackville, an extinct title in the Peerage of Great Britain
Baron Sackville, an extant title in the Peerage of the United Kingdom
Sackville School (disambiguation)
Sackville College, a historic almshouse in East Grinstead, West Sussex, England
Sackville House, East Washington, Pennsylvania, United States, on the National Register of Historic Places

See also
Sackville North, New South Wales, Australia
Upper Sackville, New Brunswick, Canada
Middle Sackville, New Brunswick
Lower Sackville, Nova Scotia, Canada
Middle Sackville, Nova Scotia
Upper Sackville, Nova Scotia